Goffredo Sommavilla (Belluno, Italia, 21 July 1850 – Montevideo, 21 October 1944) was an Italian painter, mainly of genre themes.

He was born in Belluno, studied in the Accademia di Belle Arti in Venice.  He often painted intimate family scenes, including: Le gramolatrici di canapa at the 1881 Fine Art Exposition, Milan; Flowers of Autumn at the 1881 Exposition of Fine Arts, Milan; La merenda and  Le Lavandaie at the 1881, Exposition of Fine Arts, Milan; La predica della suocera and The Beverage Hour at the 1887, Exposition of Fine Arts, Milan; Il venditore di giornali and Casa nel monti della Carinò at the 1890 Mostra of Turin. He moved in 1882 to Montevideo, Uruguay, where he remained until his death. He became a professor of painting in Montevideo, and among his contemporaries were Juan Manuel Blanes, Soneira, Diógenes Hequet, and Manuel Larravide.

References

1850 births
1944 deaths
People from Belluno
19th-century Italian painters
Italian male painters
20th-century Italian painters
Painters from Venice
Uruguayan painters
Uruguayan male artists
Italian genre painters
Accademia di Belle Arti di Venezia alumni
Italian emigrants to Uruguay
Male painters
19th-century Italian male artists
20th-century Italian male artists